The RCA Victor Symphony Orchestra, sometimes also known as the Victor Symphony Orchestra, RCA Victor Salon Orchestra, the RCA Victor Orchestra and the RCA Orchestra, was an American studio orchestra founded in 1940 by the RCA Victor record label for the purposes of making recordings. The Victor Talking Machine Company had employed a studio orchestra since the days of acoustical recording early in the 20th century. In the 1920s, Victor established the Victor Salon Orchestra based at the company's headquarters in Camden, New Jersey. This group  consisted of musicians primarily
from nearby Philadelphia and New York City and was created by longtime Victor staff conductor and arranger Nathaniel Shilkret. The name later was used for free-lance orchestras, mainly in New York City, assembled as needed to make recordings for RCA Victor through the early 1960s. Its players were recruited primarily from the New York Philharmonic, the Metropolitan Opera, the NBC Symphony Orchestra, and other major New York ensembles. The RCA Victor Orchestra recorded with several  notable conductors including Leopold Stokowski, Fritz Reiner, Dmitri Mitropoulos, William Steinberg and  Leonard Bernstein. A number of their recordings received Grammy Awards. The orchestra was disbanded in the early 1960s when RCA Victor began moving much of its Red Seal recording activity to Europe and established the RCA Italiana Orchestra at its studios in Rome.

References

1940 establishments in New Jersey
1960s disestablishments in New Jersey
Disbanded American orchestras
Symphony orchestras
Grammy Award winners
Musical groups established in 1940
Musical groups disestablished in the 1960s
RCA
Orchestras based in New Jersey